The 2008 Slovenian Supercup was a football match that saw the 2007–08 PrvaLiga champions Domžale face off against the Slovenian Cup winners Interblock. The match was held on 9 July 2008 at the Sports Park in Domžale. After 120 minutes of no goals, Interblock won their first Slovenian Supercup title by defeating Domžale 7–6 on penalties.

Match details

See also
2007–08 Slovenian PrvaLiga
2007–08 Slovenian Football Cup

References

Slovenian Supercup
Supercup
Slovenian Supercup 2008